Aitor Fernández Abarisketa (born 3 May 1991) is a Spanish professional footballer who plays for CA Osasuna as a goalkeeper.

Club career

Athletic Bilbao
Born in Arrasate, Gipuzkoa, Basque Country, Fernández joined Athletic Bilbao's youth setup in 2003, aged 12. He made his senior debut for the farm team CD Basconia in 2008, in the Tercera División.

On 29 June 2010, after being promoted to the reserves in the Segunda División B, Fernández was called up to the first team for the preseason as a backup to Gorka Iraizoz and Raúl Fernández. However, he only appeared in 19 matches for the former during the season, mainly due to a hand injury which kept him out for two months, and struggled even more in 2011–12 again due to injuries, being overtaken by new signing Jon Ander Serantes.

Fernández was loaned to Barakaldo CF of the same league on 22 July 2012 for one year, but had his contract with the Lions terminated on 28 January 2013. He signed a two-and-a-half-year deal with Villarreal CF a day later, being assigned to the B side also in the third tier.

Numancia
On 6 July 2016, Fernández signed for Segunda División club CD Numancia on a two-year contract. He made his professional debut on 4 September 2016, starting in a 1–1 away draw against AD Alcorcón.

Initially a backup to Munir, Fernández profited from national call-ups and became a regular starter, holding that position until the end of the campaign. On 27 February 2017, he extended his link until 2020.

Levante
Fernández agreed to a four-year contract with La Liga side Levante UD on 23 July 2018. His maiden appearance in the competition took place on 2 February 2019, in a 0–0 home draw with Getafe CF.

In November 2019, it was announced that Fernández might miss Levante's next match as he had been called by his local town to work at a polling station for the Spanish general election, however he was later excused from this. He signed a new deal until 2023 the same month, the new buyout clause being set at €30 million.

Osasuna
On 2 July 2022, after Levante's relegation, Fernández remained in the top flight on a three-year deal at CA Osasuna, with a release clause of €14 million.

International career
Fernández made his debut for the unofficial Basque Country national team on 30 May 2019, in a 0–0 draw away to Panama for which a small, youthful and inexperienced squad was selected.

Honours
Spain U19
UEFA European Under-19 Championship runner-up: 2010

References

External links

1991 births
Living people
People from Mondragón
Sportspeople from Gipuzkoa
Spanish footballers
Footballers from the Basque Country (autonomous community)
Association football goalkeepers
La Liga players
Segunda División players
Segunda División B players
Tercera División players
CD Basconia footballers
Bilbao Athletic footballers
Athletic Bilbao footballers
Barakaldo CF footballers
Villarreal CF B players
CD Numancia players
Levante UD footballers
CA Osasuna players
Spain youth international footballers
Basque Country international footballers